A Minecraft server is a player-owned or business-owned multiplayer game server for the 2009 Mojang Studios video game Minecraft. In this context, the term "server" often colloquially refers to a network of connected servers, rather than a single machine. Players can start their own server either by setting one up on a computer using software provided by Mojang, or by using a hosting provider so they can have their server run on dedicated machines with guaranteed uptime. The largest and most popular server is widely accepted to be the well-known minigames server Hypixel.

Minecraft multiplayer servers are controlled by server operators, who have access to server commands such as setting the time of day, teleporting players and setting the world spawn. The server owner (or users that have access to the live server files) can also set up and install plugins to change the mechanics of the server, add commands among other features, and can also set up restrictions concerning which usernames or IP addresses are allowed or disallowed to enter the server.

Multiplayer servers have a wide range of activities, with some servers having unique premises, rules, and customs. Player versus player (PvP) combat can be enabled to allow fighting between players. Custom plugins and mods can be used in servers to allow actions that are not normally possible in the vanilla form of the game. There are also several modifications of the server software that allow crossplay between the Java and Bedrock editions of the game.

History
Multiplayer was first added to Minecraft on May 31, 2009, during the Classic phase of the game. The oldest server map is called "Freedonia", in the Minecraft server MinecraftOnline. The server and map were created on August 4, 2010, within the first hour of Minecraft multiplayer being released.

In 2013, Mojang announced Minecraft Realms, a server hosting service intended to enable players to run server multiplayer games easily and safely without having to set up their own. Unlike a standard server, only invited players can join Realms servers, and these servers do not use IP addresses. At Electronic Entertainment Expo 2016, it was announced that Realms would enable Minecraft to support cross-platform play between Windows 10, iOS, and Android platforms starting in June 2016, with other platforms releasing over the next two years.

In June 2014, Mojang began enforcing the EULA of the computer versions of the game to prevent servers from selling microtransactions, which many players thought unfairly affected gameplay, such as pay-to-win items, only allowing servers to sell cosmetic items. Many servers were shut down due to this.

On September 20, 2017, the Better Together Update was released for Bedrock codebase-derived editions of the game, which added multiplayer servers, along with six official featured servers: Mineplex, Lifeboat, CubeCraft, Mineville City, Pixel Paradise, and The Hive.

On July 27, 2022, player chat reporting was added as a part of "The Wild Update", 1.19.1. This allowed players to report abusive chat messages sent by other players, and players could be banned from Multiplayer as a whole for violating Microsoft's Community Standards.

Management
Managing a Minecraft server can be a full-time job for many server owners. Several large servers employ a staff of developers, managers, and artists. As of 2014, the Shotbow server employed three full-time and five part-time employees. According to Matt Sundberg, the server's owner, "large server networks are incredibly expensive to run and are very time consuming ." According to Chad Dunbar, the founder of MCGamer, "it really costs to run networks above 1000 concurrent players." This includes salaries, hardware, bandwidth, and DDoS protection, and so monthly expenses can cost thousands of dollars. Dunbar stated that MCGamer, which has had over 50,000 daily players, has expenses that can be "well into the five-figure marks" per month. As of 2015, expenses of Hypixel, the largest server, are nearly $100,000 per month. Many servers sell in-game ranks, cosmetics and passes to certain minigames or gamemodes to pay for its expenses.

Software 
Vanilla server software provided by Mojang is maintained alongside client software. While servers must update to support features provided by new updates, many different kinds of modified server software exist. Modifications typically include optimizations, allowing more players to use a server simultaneously, or for larger portions of the world to be loaded at the same time. Modified software almost always acts as a base for plug-ins, which may be added and removed to customize server functionality. These are typically written in Java for the Java Edition, although JavaScript and PHP are used in some Bedrock Edition software. As the vanilla software for Bedrock is made compatible with only Ubuntu and Windows, modifications may allow for added compatibility. Notable plug-in software include CraftBukkit, Spigot, PaperMC and Sponge for Java and Pocketmine-MP, Nukkit, Altay and Jukebox for Bedrock.

Vanilla and modified servers alike communicate with the client using a consistent protocol but may have vastly different internal mechanisms. Certain server software can allow for servers to be linked, allowing players to dynamically cross worlds without "signing out"; these include BungeeCord and Waterfall in Java and WaterDog and Nemisys for Bedrock. In a similar vein, due to close feature parity between up-to-date editions of the game, Java servers may utilize a proxy server such as DragonProxy or Geyser to communicate with both protocols, allowing players of the Bedrock edition to join.

Notable servers 
The most popular Java Edition server is Hypixel, which, released in April 2013, has had over 20 million unique players. Other popular servers include MCGamer, released in April 2012, which has over 3.5 million unique players. CubeCraft Games released in December 2012 on Java Edition and 2018 on Bedrock Edition. Wynncraft, released in April 2013, which has over 1 million unique players; and Emenbee, released in 2011, which also has over 1 million unique players. As of 2014, servers such as Mineplex, Hypixel, Shotbow and Hive Games receive "well over a million unique users every month", according to Polygon.

List

References

Further reading

External links

 Minetrack data—historical dataset of popular Minecraft servers